The chakram is a throwing weapon from the Indian subcontinent. It is also known as chalikar meaning "circle", and was sometimes referred to in English writings as a "war-quoit". The Chakram is primarily a throwing weapon but can also be used hand-to-hand. A smaller variant called chakri is worn on the wrist. A related weapon is the chakri dong, a bamboo staff with a chakri attached at one end.

History
The earliest references to the chakram come from the 5th century BCE Indian epics Mahabharata and Ramayana where the Sudarshana Chakra is the weapon of the god Vishnu. Contemporaneous Tamil poems from the 2nd century BCE record it as thikiri (திகிரி). Chakra-dhāri ("chakram-wielder" or "disc-bearer") is a name for Krishna. The chakram was later used extensively by the Sikhs at least until the days of Ranjit Singh. Even in present days the Nihangs wear chakkar on their damalaas and is also in the uniform of Sikh Regiment worn on turban. It came to be associated with Sikhs because of the Nihang practice of wearing chakram on their arms, around the neck and even tied in tiers on high turbans. The Portuguese chronicler Duarte Barbosa writes of the chakram being used in the Delhi Sultanate.

The people of the kingdom ... are very good fighting men and good knights, armed with many kinds of weapons; they are great bowmen, and very strong men; they have very good lances, swords, daggers, steel maces, and battle-axes, with which they fight; and they have some steel wheels, which they call chakarani, two fingers broad, sharp outside like knives, and without edge inside; and the surface of these is of the size of a small plate. And they carry seven or eight of these each, put on the left arm; and they take one and put it on the finger of the right hand, and make it spin round many times, and so they hurl it at their enemies, and if they hit anyone on the arm or leg or neck, it cuts through all. And with these they carry on much fighting, and are very dexterous with them.

From its native India, variations of the Chakram spread to other Asian countries. In Tibet and Malaysia, the chakram was not flat but torus-like. Mongol cavalry used a similar throwing weapon with spiked edges.

Chakarani is a name for flat steel throwing ring similar to the chakram and used by the Jubba tribe of central Africa.

Construction

Chakram are traditionally made from steel or brass which is beaten into a circular shape against an anvil with an indentation for the curvature. Two ends are connected with a piece of brass and then heated, forming a complete circle before the brass is removed. Some chakram, even those used in combat, were ornately engraved, or inlaid with brass, silver or gold.

The smaller variations are known as chakri while the larger ones are called vada chakra which were as large as a shield.

Techniques

The chakram's combat application is largely dependent on its size. If properly constructed, it should be a perfect circle. Warriors trained by throwing chakram at lengths of green bamboo. In single combat, the chakram could be thrown underarm like a modern Aerobie. In battles, it was usually thrown vertically so as to avoid accidentally hitting an ally on the left or right side. A stack of chakram could be quickly thrown one at a time like shuriken. On elephant or horseback, chakram could be more easily thrown than spears or arrows. Because of its aerodynamic circular shape it is not easily deflected by wind.

The most iconic method of throwing a chakram is tajani, wherein the weapon is twirled on the index finger of an upraised hand and thrown with a timed flick of the wrist. The spin is meant to add power and range to the throw, while also avoiding the risk of cutting oneself on the sharp outer edge. An adept user can twirl the chakram while using another weapon with the other hand. The use of tajani in battle was perfected by the Nihang who employed a particular formation to protect the chakram-wielder from harm. Although variants of the chakram would make their way to neighbouring parts of the region, the tajani technique appears to have remained unique to Indian martial arts.

The smaller chakri could also be worn on the arms or wrists and used like knuckledusters. When worn on the arms the chakri could be used to break or cut the opponent's arms while grappling. The larger vada chakra were worn around the neck and thrown or dropped down on the opponent vertically. In the turban, it could be raked across an enemy's face or eyes while fighting.

Modern inventions and applications
In the 1970s, the American inventor Alan Adler began attempting to improve upon a flying toy disc by considering its design characteristics. He tried streamlining the shape of the disc to reduce drag, but this resulted in a disc that was more unstable in flight. Eventually, inspired by British accounts of deadly Indian weaponry and martial arts, he turned his attention to the ring shape of the chakram. This led to the development of the predecessor of the Aerobie, which was called the "Skyro".

See also
 Boomerang
 Gatka
 Javelin
 Shuriken
 Wind and fire wheels

References

External links

 Details of chakram history and use
 History of chakram
 More history and cultural details 
 http://www.flight-toys.com/rings/chackrum.html
 Chakrams history during World War One

Weapons of India
Throwing weapons
Blade weapons
Weapons in Hindu mythology
Indian inventions
Sikh Empire
Nihang